Watermelon Records was a record label based in Austin, Texas.

History
Watermelon Records was founded in 1989 by John Kunz, Heinz Gessler, and Robert Earl Keen. Keen later sold his interest in the label.

During the 1990s, Watermelon released 10-15 albums a year, mostly Americana music.

Watermelon Records filed for bankruptcy in 1998, and its assets were sold to Texas Clef Entertainment Group, an affiliate of Antone's Records.

In 2010, New West acquired the Texas Music Group, which included the Watermelon Records label.

Roster

 Asylum Street Spankers
 Austin Lounge Lizards
 Vince Bell
 Brave Combo
 Johnny Bush
 The Damnations
 Julian Dawson
 The Derailers
 Alejandro Escovedo
 Rosie Flores with Ray Campi
 The Good Sons
 The Gourds
 Hamilton Pool
 Hayseed
 High Noon
 Tish Hinojosa
 Duane Jarvis
 Santiago Jimenez, Jr.
 Hal Ketchum
 Charlie Louvin
 Iain Matthews
 Steve McNaughton
 Lisa Mednick
 Hugh Moffatt
 Katy Moffatt
 Bob Neuwirth
 Carla Olson
 Omar & the Howlers
 Maryann Price
 Doug Sahm
 Walter Salas-Humara
 The Setters
 The Silos
 Darden Smith
 Hemlock Smith
 Eric Taylor
 Timbuk 3
 Justin Trevino
 Roger Wallace
 Don Walser
 Monte Warden
 Webb Wilder and the Nashvegans
 Steve Young

See also 
 List of record labels

References

External links
 

American record labels
American independent record labels